Norwood may refer to:

Places

Australia 
 Norwood, South Australia, a suburb of Adelaide
 Norwood Football Club, an Australian rules football club
Electoral district of Norwood, a state electoral district in South Australia
 Norwood, Tasmania, a suburb of Launceston, Tasmania
 Norwood, a neighborhood in Ringwood North, Victoria
 Norwood, a former name for Burwood, Victoria, a suburb of Melbourne

Canada 
 Norwood, Nova Scotia, a community
 Norwood, Ontario, near Peterborough
 Norwood (Edmonton), a neighbourhood in north-central Edmonton, Alberta

England 
 Norwood, Derbyshire
 Norwood, North Yorkshire, a civil parish
 Norwood (UK Parliament constituency), south London
 Norwood (ward), Metropolitan Borough of Sefton
 Norwood Green, in the London Borough of Ealing
 Norwood (London County Council constituency)
 Norwood Ridge, a ridge in south London
 Norwood, an early name for the parish of Southall
 South Norwood, in the London Borough of Croydon
 Upper Norwood, within the London boroughs of Bromley, Croydon, Lambeth and Southwark
 West Norwood, in the London Borough of Lambeth

South Africa 
 Norwood, Gauteng, a suburb of Johannesburg
 Norwood, Western Cape, a suburb of Cape Town

Sri Lanka 
 Norwood, Sri Lanka, a village

United States 
 Norwood, Arkansas, an unincorporated community
 Norwood, Colorado, a statutory town
 Norland, Florida, also known as Norwood, a former census-designated place, part of the city of Miami Gardens
 Norwood, Georgia, a city
 Norwood, Illinois, a village
 Norwood, Iowa, an unincorporated community
 Norwood, Kansas, a ghost town
 Norwood, Kentucky, a city in Jefferson County
 Norwood, Pulaski County, Kentucky, an unincorporated community
 Norwood, Louisiana, a village
 Norwood, Maryland, an unincorporated community
 Norwood, Massachusetts, a town and census-designated place
 Norwood, Michigan, an unincorporated community
 Norwood Township, Michigan
 Norwood, Missouri, a city
 Norwood, New Jersey, a borough
 Norwood, New York, a village in St. Lawrence County
 Norwood, Bronx, New York, a neighborhood
 Norwood, North Carolina, a town
 Norwood, Ohio, a city
 Norwood, Oklahoma, a census-designated place
 Norwood, Oregon, an unincorporated community
 Norwood, Pennsylvania, a borough
 Norwood, Rhode Island, a neighborhood in the city of Warwick
 Norwood, Knoxville, Tennessee, a neighborhood
 Norwood, Albemarle County, Virginia, an unincorporated community
 Norwood, Nelson County, Virginia, an unincorporated community
 Norwood (Powhatan, Virginia), a 19th century plantation
 Norwood, Wisconsin, a town

Transportation
 Norwood (SEPTA station), a train station in Norwood, Pennsylvania
 Norwood Airport, a former airport in Norwood, Ontario, Canada
 Norwood Avenue (BMT Jamaica Line), a subway station in Brooklyn
 Norwood Memorial Airport, a public airport near Norwood, Massachusetts
 Norwood–205th Street (IND Concourse Line), a subway station in the Bronx

Medicine and health 

Norwood procedure, a surgery performed on the heart
Norwood scale, used to classify the stages of male pattern baldness

Other uses 
 Norwood (given name)
 Norwood (surname)
 Norwood (Berryville, Virginia), a plantation house on the National Register of Historic Places
 Norwood (Powhatan, Virginia), a plantation house on the National Register of Historic Places
 Norwood (charity), an Anglo-Jewish children and family services charity
 Norwood (film), a 1970 adaptation of the novel, starring Glen Campbell
 Norwood (novel), a 1966 novel by Charles Portis
 Norwood (soundtrack), by Glen Campbell

See also 
 Norwood High School (disambiguation)
 Norwood Park (disambiguation)
 Norwood School (disambiguation)
 Norwood, London (disambiguation)
 Norwood, Virginia (disambiguation)